Obiero is a surname. Notable people with the surname include:

John Obiero Nyagarama (born 1946), Kenyan politician
Mercy Obiero (born 1978), Kenyan weightlifter
Micah Obiero (born 2001), English footballer

Surnames of Kenyan origin